Scotline is a shipping group of companies with origins from 1979, and specializing in transporting timber, wood pulp, forestry commodities on short sea operations, whilst also providing bulk, charter and special project work.  The area covered is around the British Isles, Baltic, and North-West Europe.   The company is operating 11 of its own vessels mostly in the 30005000dwt range, while also employing others on a time charter basis.

History
Scotline was established in 1979, with the first cargo, a shipment of scotch spruce poles, being transported from Inverness, Scotland and Bremen, Germany. This developed into a regular route between Inverness and Varberg, Sweden.

Scotline purchased their first ship, the Hohebank,  in 1977.  Additional operating bases were also established at Whitstable, Kent; and Goole, Yorkshire.

In 1994 the Kent facility was changed to a 10 acre site at Rochester on the River Medway, supplemented by a further 14 acre facility nearby from 2011.  The head office was relocated from central London to Ronford, in Essex.  Scotline Terminal Goole, a separate independently run but associated stevedoring company,  was forced to close in 2010 due to the imposition of backdated port rates.

Scotline purchased their largest ship to date, the Scot Leader, the 4500dwt from Royal Bodewes Group in 2007.

In 2017 Scotline increased their fleet of owned vessels to nine with the acquisition of the 3571dwt Scot Navigator, the decision being prompted by the success of a sister ship, the Lady Ariane, the ship being used on the VarburgGunness liner service.

Scotline's next ship, the Scot Carrier, was similar to the 2007 Scot Leader from Royak Bodewes, with class 1B icebreaker certification for Baltic operations.  This was followed by three similar sister ships through to 2021, the later ones having 1A icebreaker classification and enclosed bridge wings.

On 13 December 2021 the Scot Carrier was in collision between Ystad and Bornholm, with the smaller Danish vessel, the  Karin Hoej, the latter capsizing with the body of one of its crew found dead and the other missing presumed drowned.

Fleet list

References

Notes

Footnotes

Sources

External links

 Official website

Transport companies established in 1979
Port operating companies
Shipping companies of the United Kingdom